This is a list of population demographics of New South Wales by local government area as at the .

As at census night, the local government area with the largest population density was the City of Sydney with approximately 8,335 people per square kilometre; and the area with the smallest population density was the Unincorporated Far West with approximately 0.01 person per square kilometre.

 , ABS census data for the Unincorporated Far West region was available for the  only.

References

New South Wales-related lists